Lalith Mohan (born 19 March 1990) is an Indian cricketer who plays  for Andhra. He made his Twenty20 debut on 11 January 2021, for Andhra in the 2020–21 Syed Mushtaq Ali Trophy. He made his List A debut on 8 March 2021, for Andhra in the 2020–21 Vijay Hazare Trophy.

See also
 List of Hyderabad cricketers

References

External links
 

1990 births
Living people
Indian cricketers
Andhra cricketers
Hyderabad cricketers
Cricketers from Hyderabad, India